Radio Entreolas is a radio station located in Pichilemu.

References

External links 

 Radio Entreolas

Radio stations in Chile
Mass media in Pichilemu
Organizations based in Pichilemu
Organizations established in 1999
1999 establishments in Chile